The 1918–19 Drexel Blue and Gold men's basketball team represented Drexel Institute of Art, Science and Industry during the 1918–19 men's basketball season. The Blue and Gold, led by 1st year head coach James Barrett, played their home games at Main Building.

Roster

Schedule

|-
!colspan=9 style="background:#F8B800; color:#002663;"| Regular season
|-

References

Drexel Dragons men's basketball seasons
Drexel
1918 in sports in Pennsylvania
1919 in sports in Pennsylvania